Philémon Cousineau (October 25, 1874 – March 3, 1959) was a Canadian politician born in Saint-Laurent (today part of Montreal). He was mayor of St-Laurent from 1905 to 1909, and Quebec Conservative Party leader from 1915 to 1916. He resigned following his defeat in the 1916 Quebec provincial election in the riding of Jacques-Cartier which he was the member for eight years. In 1920 he became a Quebec Superior Court judge.

See also
Politics of Quebec
List of Quebec general elections
List of Quebec leaders of the Opposition
Timeline of Quebec history

External links

1874 births
1959 deaths
Conservative Party of Quebec MNAs
Judges in Quebec
Mayors of places in Quebec
People from Saint-Laurent, Quebec
Lawyers in Quebec
Quebec political party leaders
Université Laval alumni